Kleinton is a rural locality in the Toowoomba Region, Queensland, Australia.

Geography
Kleinton is on the Darling Downs.

The area contains three bands of separate land use types. In the south rural residential blocks have been established as an extension of the urban sprawl of Highfields to the south. The central area remain vegetated and undeveloped.  The northern boundary is aligned with the southern extent of Cooby Dam.  This area remains undeveloped but has been cleared of vegetation.

History 
The locality was named after early selector Michael Klein who was shot dead at Highfields in February 1870 by James Alexander Herlich following a dispute.

The Crows Nest railway line, which operated between 1883 and 1961, had a stop at Kleinton.

Kleinton State School opened on 20 February 1911 on land donated by the Brazier family who owned the local brickworks. The school closed in December 1970.  In 1975 the Amaroo Environmental Education Centre opened in the former school building.

Education 
Amaroo Environmental Education Centre is an Outdoor and Environmental Education Centre at 90 Kleinton School Road.

There are no primary or secondary schools in Kleinton. The nearest primary schools are in Highfields, Meringandan West, and Geham. The nearest secondary school is in Highfields.

References

External links 

Toowoomba Region
Localities in Queensland